Mosè Giacomo Bertoni (15 June 1857 – 19 September 1929), known in Spanish as Moisés Santiago Bertoni, was an Italian-speaking Swiss naturalist. He emigrated to South America in 1884 and lived in Paraguay from 1887 until he died in 1929.

Bertoni work and researched in botany, meteorology, and anthropology. He discovered and classified many new species of plants and left a collection of more than 7000 vegetal species and about 6500 insects. One of the plants he studied in depth was ka'a he'ê (Stevia rebaudiana),  a herb indigenous to Paraguay, which became important as a non-caloric sweetener, reputed to be 300 times sweeter than sugar. He also scientifically classified yerba mate (Ilex paraguariensis).

Childhood and youth
He was born in the small village of Lottigna, in canton Ticino in the Italian-speaking region in Switzerland, on June 15, 1857, the son of Ambrose Bertoni, a lawyer, jurist, and official, and Josefina Torreani, a teacher from Milan.

His primary and secondary studies were completed in the Lyceum, Lugano.

In 1874 he founded, in collaboration with his mother, the first meteorological observatory of his hometown, Lottigna. In 1875, he started his studies in law and Natural Sciences in the University of Geneva. In 1876 he enrolled in the University of Zurich, where he met biochemistry student Eugenia Rossetti, whom he married the following year.

Beginnings
He left Switzerland for Buenos Aires, Argentina on March 3, 1884, on the steamer Nord Americas with his wife, their children Reto Divicone, Arnoldo da Winkelried, Vera Zassoulich, Sofía Perovskaya (Helvecia) and Inés, his mother Josefina Torreani (who left behind her husband Ambrose and his youngest son, Brennan), and some 40 farmers.

On March 30 they landed in Buenos Aires, and were interviewed by the chairman of the Nation, General Julio Argentino Roca, who provided the means to travel to and colonize the province of Misiones. They arrived in the territory of Santa Ana and Bertoni began work in agriculture, botany, zoology, meteorology, and  ethnography.

While working in Misiones he crossed the border into Paraguay, where he remained for the rest of his life.

Career

He created a community of agricultural production and scientific research. He had a Swiss colleague, Emil Hassler.

In Argentina the Bertonis' son Moisés Santiago was born; in Paraguay they had more children, Aurora Eugenia and Guillermo Tell, Walter Fürst, Werner Stauffacher and Aristóteles. He worked alone, without government support, or sources, means or instruments, in the physical and natural sciences, anthropology, making linguistic and ideological, philosophical observations and historical commentary.

In 1891 he founded on the banks of the Paraná river the  12,500 hectare (5 square miles) "William Tell Colony", today known as Puerto Bertoni, where Bertoni and his family were buried at the ends of their lives. They grew coffee, bananas and citrus to make a living and finance the scientific work, combining agricultural production and scientific research in the rural community.

Bertoni was invited by the Paraguayan president, General Juan Bautista Egusquiza (1845–1902), to form an Agricultural Institute in the capital Asunción.

He made meteorological studies for Argentine and Paraguayan governments, wrote scientific papers, and drove the leading publisher of scientific Paraguay.

In January 1988 the environmentalist "Moises Bertoni Foundation" was set up for environmental conservation, aiming to contribute to the protection and sustainable development of natural resources in Paraguay.

Death
On September 19, 1929, at the age of 72, he died of malaria in the town of Foz do Iguazu in Brazil; his wife had died three weeks before in Encarnación in the south of Paraguay, unknown to him.
The following day his body was returned to Puerto Bertoni, where he was buried near his workplace and the graves of his mother, "Nonna Peppina", and his son Linneo Carlos.

Distinctions
1896, President of Paraguay Juan Bautista Egusquiza calls him to found the National School of Agriculture, in Asunción, and runs for nine years.
1903, he organized by the National Society of Agriculture.
1905, he assists as Paraguayan Government Delegate to the Third Latin American Scientific Congress of Rio de Janeiro, where he introduced the first work on "Geology of Paraguay" and two new meteorological equipment he invented a drosómetro and a fitotermómetro.
1910, concurs commissioned by the Paraguayan government, the International Exhibition of Buenos Aires, where you get medals and diplomas. That same year he represents Paraguay in the American International Congress being held in the Buenos Aires.
1914, called by the President of the Republic of Paraguay, took the Directorate of Agriculture.
1922 attending as a delegate of the Republic of Paraguay to American International Scientific Congress in Rio de Janeiro, which presented works on anthropology and ethnography Guaraní.

Research

Bertoni researched in the physical and natural sciences, anthropology, testing linguistic and ideological, philosophical observations and historical commentary.

He studied the frequency of rain, and for fifty years made daily records of humidity, wind and temperature. He was also interested in linguistics.

He did not become well known because he worked alone, without government support, and with minimal resources, means and instruments.

Botanical collections 

His botanical collections are conserved at the Sociedad Científica del Paraguay, and were afterwards restored by the Conservatoire et Jardin botaniques de la Ville de Genève (Switzerland).

Works 
 1878: Nuovo compendio di geografia—Bellinzona : Colombi
 1882: Revista Científica Svizzera
 1886: Moises Bertoni, La Voce del Ticino
 1901: Almanaque agrícola paraguayo (Paraguayan agricultural Almanac) -- Puerto Bertoni: Printing and Publishing Former Sylvis, - 250 p.
 1903: Agenda agrícola del Paraguay (Paraguay's agricultural agenda) -- Puerto Bertoni: Printing and publishing Former Sylvis, - 360 p.
 1903: Agenda y mentor agrícola (Agenda agrícola paraguayo y Almanaque agrícola paraguayo) 
 1903: Agenda y almanaque agrícola paraguayo: conteniendo la indicación de los trabajos agrícolas de cada mes (Calendar and Almanac Paraguayan agriculture) -- Asunción: Tall. National H. Kraus - 360 p.
 1904: Meios praticos para combater o gorgulho do milho (Agenda and agricultural almanac Paraguay: containing an indication of agricultural work each month) - 2nd ed. -- Assumption: H. Kraus - 360 p.
 1905: Plantas usuales del Paraguay: Alto Paraná y Misiones; nomenclatura, caracteres, propiedades a aplicaciones según los estudios del autor, o datos de personas fidedignas o el uso que de ellas hacen los indios, incluyendo un estudio físico e industrial de las maderas (Plant usual Paraguay: Alto Parana and Misiones; nomenclature, characters, properties applications according to research by the author, or data from credible persons or make use of them Indians, including a study of physical and industrial timber)
 1905: La enseñanza agrícola (The agricultural education) -- Asunción: Tall. National H. Kraus - 100 p.
 1907: Resumen de geografía botánica del Paraguay (Summary of botany geography of Paraguay) -- Asunción: s.n.
 1909: La cubierta verde y la supresión de la escarda en las plantaciones (The green cover and the removal of the weed in plantations) --: S.n. - 18 p.
 1910: Plantae Bertonianae: les onothéracées du Paraguay—Asunción: Tall. National H. Kraus - 22 p.
 1910: Descripción física y económica del Paraguay: Plantae Bertonianae (Description of Physical and economic Paraguay: Plantae Bertonianae) -- S. L.: s.n., 20 p.
 1911: Contribución preliminar al estudio sistemático, biológico y económico de las plantas paraguayas (Contribution to preliminary systematic study, biological and economic Paraguayan plants) 2nd ed. -- S.L.: s.n.., 
 1911: Nuevo método para el cultivo del banano: práctica del rozado sin quemar(New method for growing banana: practice of "grazed unburned) -- Puerto Bertoni: Printing and Publishing Former Sylvis, - 14 p.
 1912: Contribución al estudio de la gomosis del naranjo y su tratamiento (Contribution to the study of gomosis of orange and its treatment) -- Assumption: The Printing beehive - 1 pl, 13 - 4 p.
 1913: Fauna paraguaya (Animals Paraguayan) -- S.L.: S. N.
 1913: Descripción física y económica del Paraguay (Physical description and cost of Paraguay) -- Asunción: Brossa
 1914: Ortografía guaraní sobre la base de la ortografía internacional adoptada por los congresos de zoología y botánica, con arreglo a la ortografía lingüística adoptada por el congreso científico internacional de Buenos Aires (1910) y a la generalmente seguida por los lingüistas estadounidenses (Extended Edition part of the monograph "Introduction usual plants, nomenclature, and dictionary of Latin genres Guarani of the play economic and physical description of Paraguay)
 1914: Summary of prehistory and protohistoria of countries Guarani: lectures given at the National College of second lesson of the Asuncion on July 26, 8 and August 21, 1913. -- Asunción: J.E. O'Leary. -- 1 PL., XLV, 162 p.
 1914: Ortografía guaraní sobre la base de la ortografía internacional adoptada por los congresos de zoología y botánica, con arreglo a la ortografía lingüística adoptada por el congreso científico internacional de Buenos Aires (1910) y a la generalmente seguida por los lingüistas estadounidenses (Spelling Guarani based on the international spelling adopted by the congresses of zoology and botany, according to the spelling language adopted by the international scientific congress in Buenos Aires (1910) and usually followed by linguists Americans) -- Asunción: M. Brossa, 1914. - 22 p.
 1914: Extended Edition part of the monograph Plantas usuales: introducción, nomenclatura, y diccionario de los géneros latino-guaraní de la obra Descripción física y económica del Paraguay (Introduction usual plants, nomenclature, and dictionary of Latin genres Guarani of the play economic and physical description of Paraguay)
 1914: Resumen de prehistoria y protohistoria de los países guaraníes (Summary of prehistory and protohistoria of countries Guarani: lectures given at the National College of second lesson of the Assumption on July 26, 8 and August 21, 1913). -- Assumption: J.E. O'Leary. -- 1 PL. , XLV, 162 p.
 1914: Las plantas usuales del Paraguay y países limítrofes: caracteres, propiedades y aplicaciones con la nomenclatura guaraní, portuguesa, española, latina y la etimología guaraní incluyendo un estudio físico e industrial de las maderas (The usual plants in Paraguay and neighboring countries: characters, properties and applications with the nomenclature Guarani, Portuguese, Spanish, Latin and etymology Guarani including a study of physical and industrial timber). -- Asunción: M: Brossa. - 78 p.
 1914: Descripción física y económica del Paraguay, numeración novenal 31; introducción, nomenclatura y diccionario de los géneros botánicos latino-guaraní (Physical description of Paraguay and economic" novenal numbering 31; Introduction, nomenclature and botanical dictionary of Latin genres Guarani)

See also
Doctor Moisés Bertoni, a village in the Caazapá department of Paraguay named in honor of Moisés Santiago Bertoni

References

 Baratti, D. (1999). Fare libri nella selva: Mosè Bertoni e la tipografia Ex Sylvis (1918-1929). Fondazione Jacob-Piazza,Olivone.
 Baratti, D. & P. Candolfi (1999). Vida y obra del sabio Bertoni: Moisés Santiago Bertoni (1857-1929), un naturalista suizo en Paraguay [transl. from Italian]. Helvetas, Asunción.
 Baratti, D. & P. Candolfi (1994). L'arca di Mosè: biografia epistolare di Mosè Bertoni, 1857-1929. Casagrande, Bellinzona.
 Schrembs, P. (1986). Mosè Bertoni. Profilo di una vita tra scienza e anarchia. Lugano.
 Ramella, L. & Y. Ramella-Miquel (1985). Biobibliografía de Moisés Santiago Bertoni. Fl. Paraguay, Ser. Espec. 2. 
 Sociedad Científica del Paraguay, A. Barbero 230 y Avenida Artigas, Asunción (Paraguay)
 Encyclopedia history of Paraguay, published by La Nación Journal
 Bertoni Foundation
 monografias.com
 SCHREMBS, P. (1986). Mosè Beroni. Profilo di una vita tra scienza e anarchia. Lugano

External links
 
 
 Sociedad Científica del Paraguay
 Biography of Bertoni
 
 mosebertoni.ch

1857 births
1929 deaths
19th-century Swiss botanists
People from Ticino
Paraguayan people of Italian descent
Deaths from malaria
Government ministers of Paraguay
Paraguayan botanists
Paraguayan anarchists